Lucius Frederick Hubbard (January 26, 1836February 5, 1913) was an American politician. The Republican served as the ninth Governor of Minnesota from January 10, 1882 to January 5, 1887. He also served as an officer in the Union Army during the American Civil War.

Born in 1836 in Troy, New York, and orphaned at ten, Hubbard first worked as a tinsmith in the east and then in Chicago. At age 21 he moved to Red Wing, Minnesota with an old hand-operated printing press and some type; within two months, he was publisher and editor of the Red Wing Republican, in which he promoted his strong political views.

During the American Civil War, Hubbard joined the Union Army in 1861 as a private in the 5th Minnesota Volunteer Infantry.  He took part in the siege of Corinth, the siege of Vicksburg, the battle of Nashville and the battle of Fort Blakely. He became colonel of his regiment and, for his services at Nashville, was made a brevet brigadier general on December 16, 1864. After the war's end Hubbard returned to Red Wing, where he simultaneously engaged in milling and railroading. He won election to the Minnesota State Senate, completing his second term in 1875. A partner in the Midland Railroad, he also presided over operations of the Cannon Valley Railway until his gubernatorial election in 1881.

Hubbard forcefully urged government intervention in public health, corrections, charities, railroads, agriculture, and commerce, and the legislature complied by increasing the state's regulatory and licensing powers. His second term lasted three years, in accordance with a state constitutional amendment to have state, county, and federal biennial elections all coincide.

He was a member of the Military Order of Foreign Wars, Military Order of the Loyal Legion of the United States and the Sons of the American Revolution.

In 1887 Hubbard took over operations of yet another railroad. When America declared war against Spain in 1898, President William McKinley appointed the 62-year-old as a brigadier general of volunteers and asked him to oversee a military post in Florida. Two years later, Hubbard moved to St. Paul and then to Minneapolis, where he died at 77.

Hubbard County, Minnesota is named after him.

See also
 List of American Civil War brevet generals (Union)

References

External links
Biographical information and his gubernatorial records are available for research use at the Minnesota Historical Society.
Minnesota Legislators Past and Present
Lucius F. Hubbard in MNopedia, the Minnesota Encyclopedia

  	

1836 births
1913 deaths
Politicians from Troy, New York
Republican Party governors of Minnesota
People of Minnesota in the American Civil War
Republican Party Minnesota state senators
19th-century American politicians
Union Army colonels
United States Army generals